Onchidium lixii was described as a species of air-breathing sea slug, a shell-less marine pulmonate gastropod mollusk in the family Onchidiidae. However, the name is considered a nomen dubium.

References

Onchidiidae
Gastropods described in 1934